José C. Paz Partido is a partido in the Greater Buenos Aires urban area of Buenos Aires Province in Argentina.

Economy
The main industries in J.C. Paz Partido are centered on the production of textiles, ceramics and food.

References

External links
 Jose C. Paz

 
1913 establishments in Argentina
Partidos of Buenos Aires Province
Populated places established in 1913